"Me & Dad's New Wife" is a 1976 episode of the American television anthology series ABC Afterschool Special, directed by Larry Elikann. The episode is based upon a Stella Pevsner book, A Smart Kid Like You. In this special presentation, 2 songs were played, such as "Metamorphosis" by John Fiddy and "All I Want to Be" by Danny Edwardson & Seamus Sell.

Cast
 Kristy McNichol - Nina Beckwith
 Lance Kerwin - Buzz
 Betty Beaird - Charlotte Beckwith
 Melendy Britt - Dolores Beckwith
 Leif Garrett - Roger Nichols
 Alice Playten
 Ned Wilson - George Beckwith
 Alexa Kenin
 Susannah Mars
 Orlando Ruiz

External links
 

1976 American television episodes
ABC Afterschool Special episodes